Events from the year 1736 in art.

Events

Paintings

 Bernard Accama – Anne, Princess Royal and Princess of Orange
 Canaletto – View of the Riva degli Schiavoni (Sir John Soane's Museum, London)
 Jean-Baptiste-Siméon Chardin – Woman Scouring Dishes
 William Hogarth
 Christ at the Pool of Bethesda (St Bartholomew's Hospital)
 Four Times of the Day (series)
 Clemente Ruta – Extasis of St. Peter of Alcantara (San Pietro d'Alcantara (Parma))
 Willem Van der Hagen – View of Waterford

Births
 February 5 – Joaquín Inza y Ainsa, Spanish Baroque painter (died 1811)
 February 6 – Franz Xaver Messerschmidt, German sculptor most famous for his collection of busts with extreme facial expressions (died 1783)
 February 19 – Simon Charles Miger, French engraver (died 1828)
 June 22 – Auguste-Louis de Rossel de Cercy, French painter primarily of naval scenes (died 1804)
 July 21 – Ulla Adlerfelt, Swedish painter and noblewoman (died 1765)
 August 7 – Johann Nepomuk della Croce, Austrian painter (died 1819)
 August 15 – Alexander Runciman, Scottish painter (died 1785)
 October 28 - Martin Ferdinand Quadal, Moravian-Austrian painter and engraver (died 1811)
 November 18 – Anton Graff, Swiss portrait painter (died 1813)
 November 30 – Jean-Jacques de Boissieu, French painter and etcher (died 1810)
 date unknown
 Andrea-Salvatore Aglio, Italian sculptor and painter on marble (died 1786)
 Christopher Barber, English miniature painter (died 1810)
 Charlotta Cedercreutz, Swedish painter and noblewoman (died 1815)
 Fyodor Rokotov, Russian painter specializing in portraits (died 1809)

Deaths
 April 2 – Étienne Allegrain, French topographical painter (born 1644)
 July 3 - Giuseppe Nicola Nasini, Italian painter of frescoes, director of Grand-Ducal Academy for the Arts (born 1657)
 July 25 – Jean-Baptiste Pater, French rococo painter (born 1695)
 August 14 – Victor Honoré Janssens, Flemish painter (born 1658)
 September 13 – Gaspar van Wittel, Dutch landscape painter (born 1653)
 October 23 - Tommaso Aldrovandini, Italian painter (born 1653)
 December - Antonina Houbraken, Dutch printmaker and drafter (born 1686)
 date unknown
 Niccolò Bambini, Italian painter (born 1651)
 Domenico Brandi, Italian painter primarily of still lifes of birds and animals, as well as pastoral landscapes (vedute) (born 1683)
 Miguel del Aguila, Spanish historical painter (born unknown)
 Chen Shu, Chinese painter (born 1660)

 
Years of the 18th century in art
1730s in art